Spring Mountain Motor Resort and Country Club is a race track located in Pahrump, Nevada. Currently owned by John Morris and Brad Rambo, the track hosts various driving schools, track rentals, and is home to a private motorsports country club.

The track length consists of various configurations, the longest being 6.1 miles as the longest road course in North America. The most common configurations range from 1.5 miles to 2.4 miles for the driving schools, with other custom configurations for members and track rentals.

The Ron Fellows Performance Driving School is one of the main events hosted at the track. As "The Official High Performance Driving School of Corvette," the school has 2 and 3-day programs, as well as private instructions, available for drivers of all skill levels. The courses may be taken in a C7 Corvette Stingray, Grand Sport, or Z06. New model year Corvette owners are offered the course at a subsidized rate direct from General Motors.

New to Spring Mountain is the Cadillac V-Performance Academy. As "The Official High Performance Driving School of Cadillac," the school is a 2-day program subsidized for owners of new 2017 Cadillac V-Series models.

The track also hosts Spring Mountain Racing, a maintenance and repair shop for members to keep their Radical and Wolf race cars in top condition before Club racing.

Canadian racer Rupert Bragg-Smith built the first track there in 1998 and then sold it to Morris in 2004.

References

https://www.reviewjournal.com/homes/real-estate-millions/pahrump-home-with-a-race-track-was-designed-with-thrill-seekers-in-mind-photos/

External links
Spring Mountain Motor Resort and Country Club
Club Spring Mountain
Spring Mountain Racing
Lake Spring Mountain

Motorsport venues in Nevada
Pahrump, Nevada
Buildings and structures in Nye County, Nevada
Tourist attractions in Nye County, Nevada
Road courses in the United States